Klimeschia thymetella is a moth in the Douglasiidae family. It was described by Staudinger in 1859. It is found in Portugal and Spain.

References

Moths described in 1859
Douglasiidae